Arachnis picta, the painted tiger moth, is a moth of the family Erebidae. The species was first described by Alpheus Spring Packard in 1864. It is found in the Southwestern United States and the bordering parts of Mexico.

The wingspan is about 50 mm. The moth flies during the summer.

The larvae feed on herbaceous plants, such as Lupinus, radish and Acanthus species.

Subspecies
Arachnis picta picta
Arachnis picta insularis Clarke, 1941 (California)
Arachnis picta maia Ottolengui, 1896 (Colorado)
Arachnis picta meadowsi Comstock, 1942
Arachnis picta perotensis Schaus, 1889
Arachnis picta verna Barnes & McDunnough, 1918

References

External links
eNature.com

Spilosomina
Moths described in 1864
Taxa named by Alpheus Spring Packard
Moths of North America